Sermyla is a genus of brackish water and freshwater snails with an operculum, an aquatic gastropod mollusks in the subfamily Thiarinae of the family Thiaridae.

Species
Species within the genus Sermyla include:
 Sermyla carbonata (Reeve, 1859)
 Sermyla huberi Thach, 2021
 Sermyla kupaensis Lentge-Maaß, Neiber, Gimnich & Glaubrecht, 2020
 Sermyla onca (A. Adams & Angas, 1864)
 Sermyla riqueti (Grateloup, 1840)
 Sermyla sculpta Souleyet, 1832
Synonyms
 Sermyla chaperi de Morgan, 1885: synonym of Brotia episcopalis (I. Lea & H. C. Lea, 1851) (a junior synonym)
 Sermyla kowloonensis S.-F. Chen, 1943: synonym of Sermyla riquetii (Grateloup, 1840) (junior synonym)
 Sermyla perakensis de Morgan, 1885: synonym of Brotia episcopalis (I. Lea & H. C. Lea, 1851) (junior synonym)
 Sermyla tornatella (I. Lea & H. C. Lea, 1851): synonym of Sermyla riquetii (Grateloup, 1840)
 Sermyla venustula (Brot, 1877): synonym of Sermyla carbonata (Reeve, 1859)

References

 Brandt, R. A. M. (1974). The non-marine aquatic Mollusca of Thailand. Archiv für Molluskenkunde. 105: i-iv, 1-423

External links
 Adams, H. & Adams, A. (1853-1858). The genera of Recent Mollusca; arranged according to their organization. London, van Voorst. Vol. 1: xl + 484 pp.; vol. 2: 661 pp.; vol. 3: 138 pls.
 Iredale, T. (1943). A basic list of the fresh water Mollusca of Australia. The Australian Zoologist. 10(2): 188-230
 Glaubrecht M., Brinkmann N. & Pöppe J. (2009). Diversity and disparity ‘down under': Systematics, biogeography and reproductive modes of the ‘marsupial' freshwater Thiaridae (Caenogastropoda, Cerithioidea) in Australia. Zoosystematics and Evolution. 85(2): 199-275
 Brot, A. (1874-1879). Die Melaniaceen (Melanidae) in Abbildungen der Natur mit Beschreibungen. In: Systematisches Conchylien-Cabinet von Martini und Chemnitz. Ersten Bandes, vierundzwanzigste Abtheilung. (1) 24 (229): 1-32, pls. 1-6 (1874); (1) 24 (235): 33-80, pls. 7-12 (1875); (1) 24 (244): 81-128, pls. 13-18 (1875); (1) 24 (249): 129-192, pls. 19-24 (1876); (1) 24 (259): 193-272, pls. 25-30 (1877); (1) 24 (264): 273-352, pls. 31-36 (1877); (1) 24 (271): 353-400, pls. 37-42 (1878); (1) 24 (280): 401-456, pls. 43-48 (1879); (1) 24 (283): 457-488, pl. 49 (1879). Nürnberg (Bauer & Raspe).

Thiaridae